Apostolepis dorbignyi, also known commonly as the Bolivian burrowing snake and Dorbigny's blackhead, is a species of snake in the family Colubridae. The species is native to western South America.

Etymology
The specific name, dorbignyi, is in honor of French naturalist Alcide d'Orbigny.

Geographic range
A. dorbignyi is found in Bolivia and Peru.

Habitat

Description

Diet
A. dorbignyi preys predominately upon amphisbaenians and small snakes, but will also eat other organisms found in soil such as earthworms, other invertebrates, and larvae of invertebrates.

Reproduction
A. dorbignyi is oviparous.

References

Further reading
Freiberg MA (1982). Snakes of South America. Hong Kong: T.F.H. Publications. 189 pp. . (Apostolepis dorbignyi, p. 89).
Harvey MB (1999). "Revision of Bolivian Apostolepis (Squamata: Colubridae)". Copeia 1999 (2): 388–409.
Lema T (2001). "Fossorial snake genus Apostolepis from South America (Serpentes: Colubridae: Elapomorphinae)". Cuadernos de Herpetología 15 (1): 29–43.
Schlegel H (1837). Essai sur la physionomie des serpens. Partie Générale. xxviii + 251 pp. AND Partie Descriptive. 600 + xvi pp. Amsterdam: M.H. Schonekat. (Calamaria d'orbignyi, new species, pp. 30–31 in Partie Descriptive). (in French).

dorbignyi
Reptiles described in 1837
Reptiles of Bolivia
Reptiles of Peru
Taxa named by Hermann Schlegel